Galushka (from , meaning halušky, traditional dumpling-like food) is a gender-neutral Russian surname of Ukrainian descent. It may refer to
Aleksandr Galushka (born 1975), Russian politician
Vera Galushka-Duyunova (1945–2012), Russian volleyball player

See also
Halushka
Haluska
Arany galuska

Russian-language surnames